Aura is the second studio album by The Alpha Conspiracy, released in 2004.

In a review for Splendid E-zine, Melissa Amos wrote:

Andrew Sega incorporated his vocals on some of Aura'''s songs, a practice which he wasn't previously known for. Ned Kirby of Stromkern contributed vocals in "Accelerating".Aura'' appeared at #17 in the June 2004 edition of the French Alternative Charts.

Track listing

References

External links
 Aura review at Splendid E-zine
 Aura at Allmusic

2004 albums
Andrew Sega albums